Gyranthera is a genus of tropical trees of South America and Central America in the family Malvaceae.

There are 3 species. Gyranthera caribensis is a tall (up to 60 metres) buttressed tree, which grows in the Cordillera de la Costa montane forests of northern Venezuela. Gyranthera darienensis is a threatened species endemic to Panama. Gyranthera amphibiolepis was newly described in 2012.

References

Bombacoideae
Malvaceae genera